Sándor Müller Smich (born 21 September 1948) is a Hungarian former footballer who played at both professional and international levels as a midfielder.

Career
Born in Budapest, Müller played club football in Hungary, Belgium and Spain for Vasas, Royal Antwerp and Hércules.

He also earned 17 caps for the Hungarian national team between 1970 and 1982, representing them at the 1982 FIFA World Cup.

References

1948 births
Living people
Hungarian footballers
Hungarian expatriate footballers
Hungary international footballers
Hércules CF players
Expatriate footballers in Spain
Hungarian expatriate sportspeople in Spain
La Liga players
Segunda División players
1982 FIFA World Cup players
Footballers from Budapest
Association football midfielders
Royal Antwerp F.C. players
Belgian Pro League players